Gomphidius roseus, commonly known as the rosy spike-cap or pink gomphidius, is a gilled mushroom found in Europe. Although it has gills, it is a member of the order Boletales, along with the boletes. It is a coral pink-capped mushroom which appears in pine forests in autumn, always near the related mushroom Suillus bovinus, on which it appears to be parasitic.

Taxonomy 

Gomphidius roseus was initially described by Swedish mycologist Elias Magnus Fries as Agaricus glutinosus β roseus in 1821, before he elevated it to species status and gave its current genus and binomial name in 1838. The genus name is derived from the Greek  'γομφος' gomphos meaning "plug" or "large wedge-shaped nail". The specific epithet roseus is the Latin adjective "pink".

Description 

Often slimy or sticky as with other members of the genus, its cap lacks the blackish markings of the related G. glutinosus. It is white with a pinkish or wine-coloured tint and often flushed yellow at the base. The whitish flesh may also be tinged pink and has little taste or smell. The decurrent gills are grey, and the spore print is brownish-black.

Distribution and habitat 

An uncommon fungus, Gomphidius roseus is found in Europe, but not in North America. A similar pinkish species, G. subroseus occurs in North America. G. roseus is found in Ukraine. It is found in pine woods, particularly Pinus sylvestris, associated with Suillus bovinus, and is often hidden in undergrowth. Fruiting bodies sprout in the autumn.

Ecology 

Like other members of the family Gomphidiaceae, Gomphidius roseus has been thought to be ectomycorrhizal, forming symbiotic relationship with their host trees. However, it is found exclusively with the related  Jersey cow mushroom (Suillus bovinus), and is now thought to be parasitic upon its mycelium. This is evidenced by microscopic examination, which shows that G. roseus inserts haustoria in plant root cells and does not produce significant mycelium itself. Furthermore, G. roseus is never found growing in isolation, only with S. bovinus though the latter species is found without the former.

Edibility 

Gomphidius roseus is not known to be toxic but is reported to be of poor quality and hence not recommended for picking.

References 

Boletales
Fungi of Europe